Littlehampton Lifeboat Station is a Royal National Lifeboat Institution (RNLI) station in the town of Littlehampton, in West Sussex, on the south coast of England. The station is on the harbour side on the eastern bank of the River Arun, a quarter mile from the harbour entrance and the pier. The current lifeboat house on Fisherman's Quay was built in 2002. The lifeboat station currently operates with two inshore lifeboats: a  lifeboat,  and a  lifeboat, .

History 
The RNLI  opened the first lifeboat station in the town in 1884. It was built on the east bank of the River Arun, near what is now the Harbour Park amusement park. The pulling lifeboat was manned by local sailors and fishermen using oars and sail. In 1903 the boathouse was moved closer to the lighthouse. The lifeboats were launched 26 times before this original station closed in 1921 due to lack of qualified staff, and the placement of a new motor lifeboat further west at Selsey.

Reopening and Blue Peter appeals 
Increased leisure boating in the area led to a corresponding rise in marine rescues, including swimmers and small craft washed out to sea, necessitating a faster local response. The station re-opened in 1967 as an inshore lifeboat station operating a D-class lifeboat housed in a garage on the east bank of the river Arun. The cost was defrayed by a fundraising appeal on the BBC programme Blue Peter. The lifeboat was called . The original Blue Peter 1 lifeboat was replaced three times, funded each time by appeals on Blue Peter; each replacement lifeboat retained the name Blue Peter 1 until 2016.

1979–present 
In 1979, a new boathouse was built for the station near Fishermen's Quay, enabling quick launch down a short ramp into the Arun. 

In 2002, the station underwent a large re-development to fit in with the recent waterside changes in the area. The new station has been designed specifically as a two-boat station at a cost of £550,000. At this time, the station was provided with a  lifeboat, Blue Peter 1 (B-779), at a cost of £100,000. 

A new D-class inshore lifeboat, D-631 Spirit of Juniper, was donated by the Campaign for Real Gin in 2004 at a cost of £25,000, and served until 2014. She was replaced by D-769 Ray of Hope, a later version of the D-Class IB1, funded by a private donor at a cost of £42,000.

The final Blue Peter 1 was replaced in 2016 by a  boat, Rennee Sherman (B-891).

In recent years, the station has typically responded to around 70 incidents each year, peaking at 109 in 2011.

Gallery

Neighbouring Station Locations

References 

Lifeboat stations in West Sussex
Littlehampton